Baragung Muktichhetra, earlier Bahragaun Muktichhetra is a rural municipality situated in Mustang District of Gandaki Province of Nepal The rural municipality is situated on the southern part of the Mustang, surrounded by Dalome rural municipality on the north, Gharpajhong and Thasang rural municipality on the south, Manang District on the east and Dolpa District on the west, north-southern border of the rural municipality touches border with Myagdi District.

The rural municipality is divided into 5 wards. The admin center of the rural municipality is at Kagbeni.

Kagbeni, Jhong, Chhusang and Muktinath Village development committees were Incorporated while established this rural municipality. The rural municipality came into existence on 10 March 2017, fulfilling the requirement of the new Constitution of Nepal 2015, Ministry of Federal Affairs and General Administration replaced all old VDCs and Municipalities into 753 new local level bodies.

Etymology
The rural municipality was named Bahrachhetra Muktinath at the time of establishment of this rural municipality. The rural municipality had to named Baragung Muktichhetra but by mistake it spelled to Bahragaun Muktichhetra, so in the first meeting of this rural council on 17 July 2017, it was decided to send a request to related office to make the corrections in the name of the rural municipality.

Administrative divisions
Baragung Muktichhetra is divided into 5 wards:

References

External links

Rural municipalities in Mustang District
Rural municipalities of Nepal established in 2017